Ammayenna Sthree is a 1970 Indian Malayalam-language film,  directed by K. S. Sethumadhavan. The film stars Prem Nazir, Sathyan, K. R. Vijaya and Ragini. The film has musical score by A. M. Rajah.

Plot
Hari and Ravi are roommates. Their landlord Sanku Pillai's daughter Girija falls for Ravi. Hari also is in love with Girija, but fails to tell her. One night Ravi disappears stealing Hari's money and valuables. Girija gets engaged to Sadanandan, but it turns out that she is pregnant with Ravi's child. Girija reveals the truth to Sadanandan and the wedding is stopped at the last moment. A heartbroken Sanku Pillai commits suicide. Hari saves Girija from committing suicide and marries Girija. Hari's parents abandon him. Girija and Hari move to a new city to start a new life. A baby boy is born followed by a baby girl. Misfortune strikes again when Hari dies from Police fire when passing by a protesting crowd.

After the funeral, Hari's father Gopala Pillai forcefully takes the daughter and leaves back to home. Girija follows them and takes the daughter. Gopala Pillai seeks the help of an advocate. He convinces Girija to leave the custody of the daughter to Gopala Pillai himself.

Cast

Prem Nazir as Hari
Sathyan as Advocate
K. R. Vijaya as Girija
Ragini as Bhanu
Jayabharathi as Bindu
Kaviyoor Ponnamma as Jaanu 
Adoor Bhasi as Sanku Pilla
Thikkurissy Sukumaran Nair as Sreedharan Pilla
Sankaradi as Kittu Pilla
Raghavan as Sasi
T. S. Muthaiah as Gopala Pilla
Bahadoor as Ramu
K. P. Ummer as Ravi
Paravoor Bharathan as Police officer
Thodupuzha Radhakrishnan as Sadanandan
Kottayam Santha as Ammini
Usharani  as Malathy

Soundtrack
The music was composed by A. M. Rajah and the lyrics were written by Vayalar Ramavarma, or are Traditional. This is the only Malayalam film for which Rajah composed music, though he was a popular music director in Tamil and Telugu film industries.

References

External links
 

1970 films
1970s Malayalam-language films
Films directed by K. S. Sethumadhavan